The 2017–18 Coastal Carolina Chanticleers men's basketball team represented Coastal Carolina University during the 2017–18 NCAA Division I men's basketball season. The Chanticleers, led by 11th-year head coach Cliff Ellis, played their home games at the HTC Center in Conway, South Carolina as members of the Sun Belt Conference. They finished the season 14–18, 8–10 in Sun Belt play to finish in eighth place. They lost in the first round of the Sun Belt tournament to Texas State.

Previous season
The Chanticleers finished the 2016–17 season 20–19, 10–8 in Sun Belt play to finish in a three-way tie for sixth place. As the No. 8 seed in the Sun Belt tournament, they defeated South Alabama before losing to Texas–Arlington in the quarterfinals. They received an invitation to the College Basketball Invitational where they defeated Hampton, Loyola (MD) and UIC to advance to the best-of-three finals series against Wyoming where they lost 2 games to 1.

Roster

Schedule and results

|-
!colspan=9 style=| Exhibition

|-
!colspan=9 style=| Non-conference regular season

|-
!colspan=9 style=| Sun Belt Conference regular season

|-
!colspan=9 style=| Sun Belt tournament

References

Coastal Carolina Chanticleers men's basketball seasons
Coastal Carolina
Coastal Carlina
Coastal Carlina